Agustín Ezequiel Cardozo (born 30 May 1998) is an Argentine footballer who plays for Gimnasia La Plata, on loan from Tigre.

References

1997 births
Living people
Argentine footballers
Argentine expatriate footballers
Association football wingers
Club Atlético Tigre footballers
Club y Biblioteca Ramón Santamarina footballers
NK Istra 1961 players
Club de Gimnasia y Esgrima La Plata footballers
Argentine Primera División players
Croatian Football League players
Argentine expatriate sportspeople in Croatia
Expatriate footballers in Croatia
People from San Isidro, Buenos Aires
Sportspeople from Buenos Aires Province